Suillus abietinus is a species of edible mushroom in the genus Suillus. Found in Greece, it was described as new to science in 1970 by Maria Pantidou and Roy Watling from collections made in Vytina, Arkadia.

References

External links

abietinus
Fungi of Europe
Fungi described in 1970